A cracker is a flat, dry baked biscuit typically made with flour. Flavorings or seasonings, such as salt, herbs, seeds, or cheese, may be added to the dough or sprinkled on top before baking. Crackers are often branded as a nutritious and convenient way to consume a staple food or cereal grain.

Crackers can be eaten on their own, but can also accompany other food items such as cheese or meat slices, fruits, dips, or soft spreads such as jam, butter, peanut butter, pâté, or mousse. Bland or mild crackers are sometimes used as a palate cleanser in food product testing or flavor testing, between samples.  Crackers may also be crumbled and added to soup. The modern cracker is somewhat similar to nautical ship's biscuits, military hardtack, chacknels, and sacramental bread. Other early versions of the cracker can be found in ancient flatbreads, such as lavash, pita, matzo, flatbrød, and crispbread. Asian analogues include papadum and senbei.

The characteristic holes found in many crackers are called "docking" holes. The holes are poked in the dough to stop overly large air pockets from forming in the cracker while baking.

Names
In American English, the name "cracker" usually refers to savory or salty flat biscuits, whereas the term "cookie" is used for sweet items. Crackers are also generally made differently: crackers are made by layering dough, while cookies, besides the addition of sugar, usually use a chemical leavening agent, may contain eggs, and in other ways are made more like a cake. In British English, crackers are sometimes called water biscuits, or savory biscuits.

Types
Crackers come in many shapes and sizes, such as round, rectangular, triangular, or irregular. Crackers sometimes have cheese or spices as ingredients, or even chicken stock, such as In a Biskit, which is sold internationally with various flavors.

Saltines and oyster crackers are often used in or served with soup. Similar crackers include cream crackers and water biscuits.

Cheese crackers are prepared using cheese as a main ingredient. Commercial examples include Cheez-It, Cheese Nips and Goldfish.

Graham crackers and digestive biscuits are also treated more like cookies than crackers, although they were both invented for their supposed health benefits, and modern graham crackers are sweet.

Brands
Cracker brands include Bremner Wafers, Captain's Wafers, Cheese Nips, Club Crackers, Goldfish crackers, In a Biskit, Jacob's, Ritz Crackers, Town House crackers, Triscuit, TUC, and Wheat Thins, among others.

Gallery

See also

 Cheese and crackers
 Kerupuk
 Matzo
 Pretzel
 Saltine cracker challenge
 Tortilla
 List of crackers

References

External links

 Website of Bent's Cookie Factory in Milton, MA, purveyors of "water crackers" and hardtack during the American Civil War
 Make your own cheddar crackers
 Make your own thin wheat crackers

 
Snack foods
Wheat dishes